Hristo Bahtarliev (born 11 May 1986) is a Bulgarian football goalkeeper for Belasitsa Petrich.

References

External links
 
 

Living people
People from Petrich
Bulgarian footballers
Bulgaria youth international footballers
PFC Belasitsa Petrich players
FC Montana players
OFC Vihren Sandanski players
PFC Kaliakra Kavarna players
OFC Pirin Blagoevgrad players
First Professional Football League (Bulgaria) players
Second Professional Football League (Bulgaria) players
Bulgarian expatriate footballers
Bulgarian expatriate sportspeople in Greece
Expatriate footballers in Greece
Association football goalkeepers
Sportspeople from Blagoevgrad Province
1986 births